The Boyz is a South Korean boy band formed and managed by IST Entertainment. The group debuted on December 6, 2017, with the lead single "Boy" from their debut EP The First. The group is composed of Sangyeon, Jacob, Younghoon, Hyunjae, Juyeon, Kevin, New, Q, Ju Haknyeon, Sunwoo and Eric, and previously Hwall until his departure from the group in October 2019.

History

Pre-debut
In 2016 and early 2017, various members appeared in different artists' music videos, as cameos or lead roles. Kevin was first introduced to the public as a contestant on Kpop Star 6, where he was eliminated early in the competition. Following this, he had the chance to release an OST for the drama Saimdang, Light's Diary in April 2017. Sunwoo became a contestant on High School Rapper in January 2017, where he was also eliminated early in the competition. In March 2017, Ju Haknyeon participated in Produce 101 and reached 19th place during the final episode.

On July 4, the group was first announced as Cre.kerz, through the agency's social medias. On July 18, their official name was revealed. From August 23 to October 11, their first reality show Flower Snack aired, resulting in the release of the song "I'm Your Boy". They held their first fanmeeting "Heart to Heart" for 1,000 fans on October 28.

In November, the twelve members signed contracts as exclusive models for the school uniform brand Skoolooks, as well as the cosmetic brand Siero Cosmetic.

On December 4, Cre.ker Entertainment confirmed that the group had signed a contract with Sony Music for their Japan promotions.

2017–2018: Debut and early days
On December 6, The Boyz officially debuted with the release of their first extended play The First and its lead single "Boy". From February 12 to March 15, their second reality show The  100 aired on V Live. As the result of this show, they held an online mini-concert on March 23. Sangyeon had his first fixed cast appearance on the show We are the One that aired from February 26 until its cancellation on March 26. The Boyz were invited to perform at the 12th Asian Film Awards on March 17 in Macau, their first overseas performance.

The group released their second extended play The Start and its lead single "Giddy Up" on April 3, 2018. Due to health problems, Hwall couldn't promote with the group and subsequently had to halt all activities for three months.

The twelve members, with Hwall back from his hiatus, released a special digital single titled "Keeper" on July 12, which was produced by Block B's Park Kyung. On July 24, they won their first "Rookie Award" during the Korea Brand Awards.

The group appeared on the reality show Happy Arrived At Our House that aimed to raise awareness of the problem of abandoned street dogs in Korea. They temporarily took care of two puppies until they were found a home.

On August 30, the group won another "Rookie Award" at the Soribada Best K-Music Awards. On September 5, they made their first comeback in 5 months with the single The Sphere and the song "Right Here".

The group released their third extended play The Only and its lead single "No Air" on November 29, 2018.

On December 1, the group won another "Best New Male Artist Award" at the 2018 Melon Music Awards.

2019: Japanese debut and Hwall's departure
The group released their second single album Bloom Bloom and its lead single "Bloom Bloom" on April 29.

On May 7, The Boyz received their first-ever music show win on SBS MTV's The Show.

The group released their fourth extended play Dreamlike and its lead single "D.D.D" on August 19.

On October 23, Hwall officially left the group due to health issues and pursued a solo and acting career afterwards.

On November 6, The Boyz officially debuted in Japan with the release of their first Japanese extended play Tattoo and its lead single with the same name.

On December 6, the group released a special digital single titled "White (화이트)" to commemorate their second anniversary. Between December 11 and 20, the group toured in Berlin, Paris, London, and Amsterdam as part of their European tour titled Dreamlike.

2020–2021: Kingdom Survival and commercial success
On February 10, 2020 the group released their first studio album Reveal and its lead single "Reveal". On March 20, it was announced that the group will join Mnet's reality television competition Road to Kingdom. On June 12, they released their new song "Checkmate" for the show's finale. The group eventually finished in first place, winning the show and securing a spot in upcoming Mnet program Kingdom: Legendary War.Their fifth EP Chase was released on September 21 with the lead single "The Stealer". 
On December 7, the group released a special digital single titled "Christmassy!", to commemorate their third anniversary with 'The Azit: 永華' promotions.

On January 12, 2021, it was announced that the group will release their first Japanese studio album Breaking Dawn on March 17.

The Boyz participated in Kingdom: Legendary War, starting from April 2021, where the group finished in second place.On July 11, The Boyz released the promotional single "Drink It" through Universe Music for the mobile application, Universe.

They released their sixth extended play Thrill-ing on August 9, with the lead single "Thrill Ride" was described as a trendy Hip hop. On August 20, they won their first "public broadcasting" music show trophy on KBS's Music Bank. The EP sold 523,630 copies in the first week of its release on Hanteo Chart and making them became the eighth-highest first-week sales of any boy group in Hanteo Chart.

On September 17, Kakao Entertainment announced The Boyz's company, Cre.ker Entertainment and PlayM Entertainment, will merge to launch a new integrated label.

On October 2, The Boyz won "Artist of the Year" on 2021 The Fact Music Awards.On November 1, The Boyz released their third single album Maverick.The single consists of three-track including the Hip-hop lead single "Maverick".On December 6, the group released a special digital single titled "Candles", to commemorate their fourth anniversary.

2022–present: Be Aware and Be Awake
On May 27, 2022, The Boyz released their second Japanese extended play She's the Boss, the first release under their new label, Universal Music IST.

On June 17, 2022 The Boyz released their second promotional single "Sweet" through Universe.On August 16, The Boyz released their seventh extended play Be Aware.On August 30, it was announced that Sunwoo would be suspending activities due to health issues.

On February 20, 2023 The Boyz released their eighth EP Be Awake.The EP consists of six-tracks with the lead single "Roar", which was described as a R&B Pop dance song.

Members
Adapted from their Naver profile and official website.

Current
 Sangyeon (상연) – leader, vocalist
 Jacob – vocalist
 Younghoon – vocalist
 Hyunjae – vocalist
 Juyeon – dancer, vocalist
 Kevin – vocalist
 New – vocalist
 Q – dancer, vocalist
 Ju Haknyeon – dancer, vocalist
 Sunwoo – rapper
 Eric – rapper, vocalist, dancer 
Former
 Hwall – dancer, rapper

Discography

Studio albums

Soundtrack albums

Extended plays

Single albums

Singles

Other releases

Other charted songs

Filmography

Reality shows

Videography

Music videos

Concerts and tours

Headlining tours
World tours
 The  Boyz First World Tour "The B-Zone" (2022)

Europe tours
 First Europe Tour "Dreamlike" (2019)

Japan tours
 The Boyz Japan Tour The B-Zone (2022)

Awards and nominations

Notes

References 

 
IST Entertainment artists
Kakao M artists
Universal Music Japan artists
K-pop music groups
Musical groups established in 2017
South Korean boy bands
South Korean pop music groups
South Korean dance music groups
Musical groups from Seoul
2017 establishments in South Korea
Japanese-language singers of South Korea